The Pioneer Bowl was the name of some December college football bowl games played in two different eras. Between 1971 and 1982, the game was contested 10 times in Texas as an NCAA College Division regional final, or as a playoff game for Division II or Division I-AA. Between 1997 and 2012, the game was played 14 times in the South between historically black colleges and universities (HBCUs).

History

Earlier Pioneer Bowls
The Pioneer Bowl was originally one of the four regional finals in the College Division (which became Division II and Division III in 1973).  It was played for this purpose in 1971 and 1972 in Wichita Falls, Texas; there were no playoffs as the national champion was determined by poll at the end of the regular season. The game succeeded the Pecan Bowl, which was played in Abilene (1964–67) and Arlington (1968–70). The other three regional finals were the Boardwalk, Grantland Rice, and Camellia bowls.

With the launch of Division II in 1973 and its full playoff system, the Pioneer Bowl was one of the two Division II semifinals (with the Grantland Rice Bowl) for the first three years, and then became the championship game for two years. For the inaugural season of Division I-AA in 1978, the Pioneer Bowl became the new division's title game. The I-AA title game was played in Florida in 1979 and California in 1980, then returned to Wichita Falls as the Pioneer Bowl in 1981 and 1982.

HBCUs
Starting in 1997, the game was contested between teams from the Central Intercollegiate Athletic Association (CIAA) and the Southern Intercollegiate Athletic Conference (SIAC), two athletic conferences composed mainly of HBCUs. It was one of only three NCAA Division II sanctioned bowl games. No game was played in 2002 or 2008, and the final playing of the game took place in 2012. The 2013 edition was canceled, and the event was indefinitely suspended in 2014.

Tuskegee University had the most appearances and wins at the Pioneer Bowl, winning 7 times in 10 appearances. Until 2012, Tuskegee's regular season extended longer than most other Division II teams (its last regular season game was the Turkey Day Classic on Thanksgiving Day), which prevented the team from playing in the NCAA's Division II playoff tournament; the Pioneer Bowl was thus the only way Tuskegee could play in the postseason.

In popular culture
"Pioneer Bowl" was used in 1993 as the name of a fictional bowl game played at the Alamodome in the television series Coach.

Game results

Earlier Pioneer Bowls

HBCUs
Winning teams and their scores appear in bold font.

Of the 14 games played between HBCUs, SIAC teams won 9 and CIAA teams won 5.

Cancelled games

See also
 List of college bowl games
 Heritage Bowl, a contemporary HBCU bowl game, which operated from 1991 to 1999
 Celebration Bowl, a current bowl game for HBCUs within the Football Championship Subdivision

References